Marcus Forrester is a fictional character from the American CBS soap opera, The Bold and the Beautiful, portrayed by Texas Battle. He first appeared on May 14, 2008. In early stages of his storyline, it was revealed he was the long-lost son of Donna Logan (Jennifer Gareis) and his father, Justin Barber (Aaron D. Spears) was introduced to the serial after Marcus. He has had relationships with Steffy Forrester and has fathered Amber Moore's child in 2011. For the role, Battle was nominated In 2009 and 2010 for an NAACP Image Award© in the category of “Outstanding Actor in a Daytime Drama Series" for his portrayal of Marcus. He is described as "Smooth, suave, and oh so charming, ladies’ man, Marcus Forrester never fails to make women swoon".

Storylines
Marcus is first introduced attending the funeral of Storm Logan. After his arrival, he begins working at Forrester Creations. He is revealed to be the son of Donna Logan and Justin Barber but he was adopted by Eric Forrester during Donna's marriage to Eric. Marcus explained that the Waltons were good to him but he never felt that he connected with them emotionally. Saying that "they just want him to be happy" they let go of their parental rights which permitted him to be adopted by wealthy Eric Forrester.
 
Eric gives Marcus a position at Forrester Creations in the shipping department, working with Eric's granddaughter Steffy. Steffy and Marcus instantly click, and begin to date. Donna warns Marcus to be cautious of Steffy. The Unstable Pam Douglas (Steffy's great-aunt) convinces Steffy to spy on Marcus, which she does. When Steffy learns the truth about Marcus being Donna's child, she is angry about him not telling her. Later Marcus became head of shipping at the company, becoming Steffy's boss, complicating their relationship after his mother Donna fired Steffy's entire family.

Despite being Steffy's boss, he is still deeply in love with his mother's step-granddaughter. Marcus finally wised up to Owen's conniving and manipulation of his mother that he finally had a confrontation with him. After sharing his concerns with his aunt, Brooke Logan, and after talking it over with his mother, Donna finally let Owen go, realizing that she was acting on impulse, aided and abetted by Owen. Owen went back to San Diego, and Marcus, to celebrate, took Steffy and played hooky from work to have fun on the beach. However, unbeknownst to Marcus, Owen still stayed in Los Angeles; and convinced Donna to not sign the papers to take Eric off the ventilator. Owen convinced Marcus that Ridge was wanting to do in Eric; and Marcus confronted him. Ridge admitted what he did was wrong, but he also told Marcus to stay away from Steffy, his daughter. Marcus tried to break it off with her, but she still felt in love with him. They had a wonderful time at Bikini Beach.

Marcus however, later remembered that Eric had been given a bottle of gin from Owen, and he had suspicions that something had been put in it. He convinced Bridget that something was horribly amiss, and asked her to do a toxicology test on her father. Bridget did so, and was shocked to discover that on a blood sample that had been taken when Eric had come into the hospital, that there was a high level of poison in that sample. When she revealed the results to Owen, Donna and Marcus, that was enough proof for him to accuse Owen of poisoning Eric to get at Donna and the Forrester fortune.
Eventually it was revealed that Pamela herself had poisoned Eric with a contaminated Lemon Bar, and thanks to Marcus' investigative ability, this has allowed Ridge to relent in his opinion of Marcus, and allowed Steffy to continue seeing him, which overjoys her. However, Marcus becomes an accidental victim of the demented Pamela, when she orders him to pick up a shipment, and he is attacked by a giant cobra, which was meant for his mother. Marcus continues his relationship with Steffy after recovering from his cobra bite. Steffy breaks up with him after becoming attracted to Rick. This attraction, a result of the death of her sister Phoebe, caused nearly every character on the show intense pain.

Marcus later dates Dayzee Leigh, a young woman who works with the homeless. However the relationship doesn't work out, and Dayzee later becomes involved with Steffy's older brother Thomas Forrester. She and Thomas end up breaking up, and Dayzee reunites with Marcus. Amber Moore gives birth to a baby girl. When a DNA test reveals that Marcus is the father, not Liam Spencer or Oliver Jones, it is revealed that he and Amber had a brief romance resulting in her pregnancy. They name their daughter Ambrosia Barber-Forrester and nickname her Rosie. Amber's  attempts several times to start a relationship with Marcus but had already reconciled with Dayzee instead. Amber eventually gives up on Marcus and offers her complete support for their relationship. Marcus and Dayzee became engaged and marry soon after. His happiness is short lived when he is accused of running over his friend, Anthony. However, with Caroline Spencer and her then-boyfriend, Thomas Forrester's help Marcus is acquitted of the charge.

References

The Bold and the Beautiful characters
Television characters introduced in 2008
Male characters in television
Fictional business executives
Forrester family
Logan family